Karl G. Kessler (1919–1997) was president of the Optical Society of America in 1969. He had also been the associate director for international and academic affairs at the National Institute of Standards and Technology.

See also
Optical Society Presidents

References

External links
 Articles Published by Karl G. Kessler Journal of the Optical Society of America

1919 births
1997 deaths
University of Michigan alumni
Presidents of Optica (society)
20th-century American physicists
Fellows of the American Physical Society